Dariusz Brytan (born April 16, 1967) is a Polish former footballer.

Club career
He started his career in Metalowiec Janów Lubelski before playing for Stal Stalowa Wola, Polonia Gdańsk, Motor Lublin, KSZO Ostrowiec Świętokrzyski, Ceramika Opoczno, RKS Radomsko, Pogoń Staszów, Janowianka Janów Lubelski.

He started a new career as a football trainer and council member in 2004/05, as a panel member on a committee concerning health, education, culture and sport.

Private life
He is a father of Sebastian Brytan; a former footballer associated with Janowianka Janów Lubelski, KSZO Ostrowiec Świętokrzyski and Stal Kraśnik.

References

1967 births
Living people
Polish footballers
Stal Stalowa Wola players
Polonia Gdańsk players
Motor Lublin players
KSZO Ostrowiec Świętokrzyski players
Ceramika Opoczno players
RKS Radomsko players
Pogoń Staszów players
Sportspeople from Wrocław
Association football forwards